Idsteiner Kantorei (Idstein chorale) is a mixed choir in Idstein, Rheingau-Taunus-Kreis, Germany. The group performs regularly in the Protestant Unionskirche in services and concerts, also in smaller churches of the region and internationally. They practice collaboration with other choirs for larger projects.

History and location 
The Idsteiner Kantorei was founded by Edwin Müller in 1972, based on the church choir at the Unionskirche. He was succeeded by Carsten Koch, who is also lecturer of conducting at the Musikhochschule Frankfurt, in 2003. The choir performs in major services, such as Christmas, Easter and Konfirmation, and sings regular concerts, some in chamber formation in the smaller historic churches of the region.

The historic Unionskirche had a 1783 , which was replaced in 1912 by an instrument of Walcker, but retaining the historic case (Prospekt).

Choral concerts 
In 2002, on the occasion of the Hessentag, the choir and the choirs of St. Martin, Idstein, performed Haydn's  in two concerts, one "not only for children". The conductors Müller and Franz Fink each conducted half of the work, with soloists Valentina Farcas, Daniel Sans and Johannes Schendel, and again the Antichi Strumenti. In 2010, another joined project of these choirs was Verdi's Messa da Requiem. Now Carsten Koch and Frank Fink conducted the Nassauische Kammerphilharmonie and soloists Christiane Kohl, Christa Bonhoff, Dantes Diwiak and Andreas Pruys. In an international collaboration also with the Belgian choir De Wase Kantorij from the sister town Zwijndrecht, they performed again Haydn's Die Schöpfung in 2016, with soloists Susanne Völger, Christian Rathgeber and Johannes Hill, both in Idstein and in Zwijndrecht. In 2017, the Idsteiner Kantorei could perform a concert in the Unionskirche again, after it had been renovated for several years. They performed Ola Gjeilo's Sunrise Mass and Eric Whitacre's Five Hebrew Love Songs.

References

External links 
 
 Idsteiner Kantorei chorverband-ekhn.de

German choirs
Rheingau-Taunus-Kreis